Started in 1901 and completed in 1902, St. Thomas Aquinas Church is the oldest church in Palo Alto, California and is a registered historic landmark. Its distinctive Carpenter Gothic Victorian style makes it a signature building for the downtown area.

The church is located just three blocks south of University Avenue. At the corner of Waverley and Homer Avenues, it's at the northern edge of the historic Professorville neighborhood of the city. The church was used as a location in the Hal Ashby film Harold and Maude (1971).

St. Thomas Aquinas Parish also includes two other churches, Our Lady of the Rosary Church and St. Albert the Great Church, both also in Palo Alto. The three parishes, as well as St. Aloysius Church in Palo Alto and the Newman Center and St. Ann Chapel at Stanford University were merged into one parish in 1987. St. Aloysius was closed in 1994, the Newman Center at Stanford was reestablished as St. Dominic Parish in 1997, and St. Ann was sold in 1999.

As of the present St. Thomas Aquinas Church is the parish church of St. Thomas Aquinas Parish, which also has two Chapels of ease.

See also
 Roman Catholic Diocese of San Jose in California

References

External links
 Saint Thomas Aquinas Parish

Churches in Santa Clara County, California
Buildings and structures in Palo Alto, California
Roman Catholic churches in California
Roman Catholic churches completed in 1902
Roman Catholic Diocese of San Jose in California
Carpenter Gothic church buildings in California
Victorian architecture in California
20th-century Roman Catholic church buildings in the United States